Saranthe is a genus of plants native to Brazil and Paraguay, described as a genus in 1861.

 Species

References

Marantaceae
Zingiberales genera